Argentina competed at the 1992 Winter Olympics in Albertville, France.

Competitors
The following is the list of number of competitors in the Games.

Alpine skiing

Men

Women

Women's combined

Biathlon

Men

Women

 1 A penalty loop of 150 metres had to be skied per missed target.
 2 One minute added per missed target.

Cross-country skiing

Men

 1 Starting delay based on 10 km results. 
 C = Classical style, F = Freestyle

Women

 2 Starting delay based on 5 km results. 
 C = Classical style, F = Freestyle

Freestyle skiing

Men

Luge

Men

References

Official Olympic Reports
sports-reference

Nations at the 1992 Winter Olympics
Winter
1992